Kurmantau (Qormantaw) is a rural locality (a selo) in Burlinsky Selsoviet, Gafuriysky District, Bashkortostan, Russia. The population was 420 as of 2010. There are 8 streets.

Geography 
Kurmantau is located 36 km north of Krasnousolsky (the district's administrative centre) by road. Ust-Belishevo is the nearest rural locality.

References 

Rural localities in Gafuriysky District